Paraceto is a genus of Chinese and Korean araneomorph spiders in the family Trachelidae, first described by C. Jin, X. C. Yin & F. Zhang in 2017.  it contains only two species.

References

External links

Araneomorphae genera
Trachelidae